Xanthomixis is a genus of birds in the Malagasy warbler family, Bernieridae. It contains the tetrakas.

Species

References
Myers, P., R. Espinosa, C. S. Parr, T. Jones, G. S. Hammond, and T. A. Dewey. 2006. The Animal Diversity Web (online). Accessed August 28, 2007 

Bird genera
Malagasy warblers